In mathematics, solvable may refer to:
Solvable group, a group that can be constructed by compositions of abelian groups, or equivalently a group whose derived series reaches the trivial group in finitely many steps
Solvable extension, a field extension whose Galois group is a solvable group
Solvable equation, a polynomial equation whose Galois group is solvable, or equivalently, one whose solutions may be expressed  by nested radicals
Solvable Lie algebra, a Lie algebra whose derived series reaches the zero algebra in finitely many steps
Solvable problem, a computational problem that can be solved by a Turing machine
Exactly solvable model in statistical mechanics, a system whose solution can be expressed in closed form, or alternatively, another name for completely integrable systems

See also
 solved game
 solubility